Lady Jaydee is a Tanzanian singer. She specializes in the R&B/Zouk/Afro Pop genres. She is the recipient of more than 10 Tanzania Music Awards, an Africa Magazine Muzik Award, an East Africa TV Award, an All African Music Award, a Clouds FM Award, two Kenya Bingwa Music Awards, and many more.

Channel O Music Video Awards 

|-
|2003
|Machozi
|Best African East
|
|-
|rowspan=2|2005
|Distance 
|Best Video East Africa 
|
|-
|Makini (Ft Titi)
|Best Collaboration Video
|
|-
|2006
|Njalo (Featuring Mina Nawe)
|Best Collaboration 
|
|-
|}

Kora Awards 

|-
|2003
|Herself
|Most Promising Female Artist Africa
|
|-
|2005
|Herself
|Best Female Artist East Africa 
|
|-
|}

Pearl of Africa Music Awards 

|-
|2006
|Herself
|Best Female Artist (Tanzania)
|
|-
|2007 
|Herself
|Best Female Artist (Tanzania)
|
|-
|2008
|Herself
|Best Female Artist (Tanzania)
|
|-
|2010
|Herself
|Best Female Artist (Tanzania)
|
|-
|2011
|Herself
|Best Female Artist (Tanzania)
|
|-
|}

M-Nets Africa Awards 

|-
|2001
|Herself
|Best Female Artist From Tanzania
|
|-
|}

Tanzania Youth Achievements Awards 

|-
|2003
|Usiusemee Moyo
|Best RnB Song
|
|-
|}

BBC Radio Music Awards 

|-
|2005
|Song Of The Year
|Distance
|
|-
|}

Uganda Divas Awards 

|-
|2011
|Herself
|Best Female Artist in Tanzania
|
|-
|}

Tanzania People's Choice Awards 

|-
|2014
|Yahaya
|Favorite Female Video
|
|-
|2015
|herself
|Favorite Female Artist
|
|-
|}

Baab Kubwa Magazine Awards 

|-
|2012
|herself
|Best Female Artist
|
|-
|}

Kisima Music Awards (Kenya) 

|-
|rowspan=2|2008
|rowspan=2|Anitha with Matonya
|Song Of The Year
|
|-
|Collaboration of The Year
|
|-
|}

Kenya Bingwa Music Awards 

|-
|2015
|Yahaya
|East African Song Of The Year
|
|-
|}

Clouds FM Awards 

|-
|2000
|Herself
|Best Female Singer
|
|-
|2011
|Herself
|Fiesta Hall Of Fame Award
|
|-
|}

Tanzania Music Awards 

|-
|rowspan=2|2002 
|herself
|Best Female Artist
|
|-
|Machozi
|Video Of The Year
|
|-
|2004
|Binti
|Best RnB Album
|
|-
|2007
|Hawajui (with Mwana FA)
|Best Collaboration
|
|-
|2008
|Herself
|Best Female Artist
|
|-
|rowspan=2|2009
|rowspan=2|Anitha with Matonya
|Best Collaboration 
|
|-
|Song Of The Year
|
|-
|rowspan=3|2010
|rowspan=2|Herself
|Best Female Singer 
|
|-
|Song Writer Of the Year
|
|-
|Natamani Kuwa Malaika
|Video Of the year
|
|-
|rowspan=3|2011
|rowspan=2|Herself
|Best Female Artist
|
|-
|Best Female Singer
|
|-
|Nitafanya ( With Kidumu)
|East Africa Song Of the year
|
|-
|rowspan=5|2012
|Herself
|Best Female Artist
|
|-
|rowspan=3|Wangu ( Ft Mr Blue)
|Best Zouk/Rhumba Song
|
|-
|Best Video
|
|-
|Best Collaboration
|
|-
|Kilimanjaro (Joh Makini Ft Gnako and Lady Jay Dee)
|Best HipHop Song
|
|-
|2013
|Herself
|Best Female Artist
|
|-
|rowspan=6|2014
|Herself
|Best Female Singer
|
|-
|rowspan=3|Yahaya
|Best Zouk/Rhumba Song
|
|-
|Song Of The Year
|
|-
|Video Of The Year
|
|-
|rowspan=2|Joto Hasira (Ft Professor Jay)
|Afro- Pop Song Of The Year 
|
|-
|Best Collaboration
|
|-
|rowspan=3|2015
|Herself
|Best Female Singer
|
|-
|Historia and Nasimama
|Best Zouk/Rhumba Song
|
|-
|Forever ft Dabo
|Best Collaboration
|
|-
|}

East Africa TV Awards 

|-
|2016
|Ndi Ndi Ndi 
|Best Female Artist 
|
|-
|}

Africa Magazine Muzik Awards 

|-
|2014
|Herself
|Best Female Artist East Africa
|
|-
|2015
|Herself
|Best Humanitarian Artiste
|
|-
|2017
|Herself
|Best Female Artist East Africa
|
|}

All African Music Awards 

|-
|2017
|Sawa Na Wao
|Best Female Artist In Eastern Africa
|
|}

References 

Lists of awards received by Tanzanian musicians